Nationality words link to articles with information on the nation's poetry or literature (for instance, Irish or France).

Events
 Christopher Smart wins the Seatonian Prize for the fifth time (he won the same prize in 1750; 1751 1752, and 1753
Paradise Lost is translated into French prose by Louis Racine.

Works published
 Mather Byles, ' 'The Conflagration' ', a long poem in heroic couplets detailing the physical phenomena of Judgment Day, English Colonial America
 John Byrom, Epistle in Defence of Rhyme, published in Roger Comberbach's A Dispute; also published in 1755 under the title The Contest
 George Colman, the elder, and Bonnell Thornton, editors, Poems by Eminent Ladies, an anthology with verse by 18 women poets, including Aphra Behn, Elizabeth Carter, Mary Leapor, Anne Finch, Katherine Philips, Margaret Cavendish, Duchess of Newcastle-upon-Tyne Mary Monck, Lady Mary Chudleigh and Mary Barber
 John Gilbert Cooper, The Tomb of Shakespear (see also the second edition, "corrected; with considerable alterations" and subtitled "A vision" 1755)
 David Dalrymple, editor, Edom of Gordon: an ancient Scottish poem
 Robert Dodsley, fourth volume of Collection of Poems
 Stephen Duck, Caesar's Camp; or, St. George's Hill

Births
Death years link to the corresponding "[year] in poetry" article:
 February 13 – Philibert-Louis Debucourt (died 1832), French painter, engraver and poet
 February 21 – Anne Grant (died 1838), Scottish poet
 March 15 – George Dyer (died 1841), English classicist and prolific writer
 April – Robert Merry (died 1798), English poet and dilettante
 April 16 – Louise Élisabeth Vigée Le Brun (died 1842), French portrait painter and poet
 October – George Galloway, Scottish poet and playwright
 November 6 – Cynthia Lenige (died 1780), Frisian Dutch poet

Deaths
Death years link to the corresponding "[year] in poetry" article:
 June 14 – Mary Barber (born 1685), poet and member of Jonathan Swift's circle
 Vijaya Dasa (born 1682), Indian devotional poet

See also

Poetry
List of years in poetry

Notes

18th-century poetry
Poetry